Carl Zeus Issariotis (born June 26, 1981 in Toronto, Ontario) is a Canadian figure skater who currently represents Greece internationally. He is the 2004 & 2006 Greek national champion. He previously competed representing Canada, most notably on the Junior Grand Prix circuit, but switched to representing Greece after taking a break from competitive skating.

References

External links
 

Canadian male single skaters
Greek male single skaters
1981 births
Living people
Figure skaters from Toronto